Thomas William Leather (2 June 1910 – 10 May 1991) was an Australian first-class cricketer who represented Victoria. He also played Australian rules football with North Melbourne in the Victorian Football League (VFL).

Family
Thomas William Leather was born at Rutherglen, Scotland on 2 June 1910.

He married Edith Dorothy Ponsford (1904–1984), the sister of Bill Ponsford in 1939. They had two children; a daughter and a son. Their son, John Ponsford Leather, died suddenly in 1950, at the age of seven.

Education
He attended Caulfield Grammar School in 1925 and 1926.

Football

North Melbourne (VFL)
Leather played 16 games and kicked 11 goals for North Melbourne in a brief career which encompassed the 1932 and 1933 VFL seasons.

Williamstown (VFA)
Granted a permit by the VFA to transfer from St Kilda to Williamstown on 12 April 1939, he played in 8 games for the Williamstown Football Club, in the VFA, in 1939.

Cricket
He appeared in four first-class cricket matches for Victoria in 1934 and 1935, taking 14 wickets at 26.07. On the back of these performances, he was picked to tour Ceylon and India with the Australian cricket team in 1935–36. Australia's Test team was touring South Africa at the time so this was a second string side. As a result, the matches against India, which Leather took part in, were given first-class status but were not Test matches.

After going wicket-less in their match against Ceylon, Leather went to India and played in all four 'Tests'. He took 21 wickets in those matches, taking five wicket hauls in Calcutta and Lahore to finish the Indian tour with an impressive 47 first-class wickets at 17.25. This made him Australia's most successful bowler for the tour after Frederick Mair and Ron Oxenham.

Although Leather was only 25 when he returned to Australia, he played just one more first-class match in his career. This was for the Don Bradman's XI in the Bardsley-Gregory Testimonial Match against the Victor Richardson's XI at the Sydney Cricket Ground.

Military service
He enlisted in the Second AIF on 4 June 1940, and was discharged on the grounds of "being medically unfit for service not occasioned by his own defaults" on 6 August 1940.

Footnote

References
 A Speedy Scot: Leather's Good Bowling, The Sporting Globe, (Saturday, 4 February 1933), p.3.
 
 
 World War Two Nominal Roll: Gunner Thomas William Leather (VX18841), Department of Veterans' Affairs.
 World War Two Service Record: Gunner Thomas William Leather (VX18841), National Archives of Australia.

External links 

 
 
 Thomas Leather, at The VFA Project.
 
 Australian Sports Museum: Tom Leather.

1910 births
1991 deaths
VFL/AFL players born outside Australia
People educated at Caulfield Grammar School
Australian cricketers
Victoria cricketers
Australian rules footballers from Victoria (Australia)
Scottish players of Australian rules football
North Melbourne Football Club players
Williamstown Football Club players
Scottish emigrants to Australia
Sportspeople from Rutherglen
Australian Army personnel of World War II
Australian Army soldiers
D. G. Bradman's XI cricketers
Military personnel from Victoria (Australia)
Cricketers from Victoria (Australia)
Scottish cricketers